Camelimonas abortus is a Gram-negative, rod-shaped and non-spore-forming bacteria from the genus of Camelimonas which has been isolated from placental tissue of a Holstein Friesian cattle in Derbyshire in England.

References

Hyphomicrobiales
Bacteria described in 2012